The suffix -monas is used in microbiology for many genera and is intended to mean "unicellular organism".

Meaning
The suffix -monas found in many genera in microbiology is similar in usage to -bacter, -bacillus, -coccus or -spirillum. The genera with the suffix are not a monophyletic group and the suffix is chosen over -bacter, often simply out of stylistic preferences to match with Greek words.

The first genus to be given the suffix -monas was Pseudomonas, a genus of gammaproteobacteria. The generic epithet Pseudomonas was coined by Walter Migula in 1894, who did not give an etymology.
However, "false unit" conceptually does not make much sense, namely, it does not mean "an organism which may falsely appear as a single unit but it is not" as it is not found in multicellular chains nor was it ever described as such. One speculation is that the name was chosen simply out of aesthetics, while the most plausible theory states that Migula intended it as false Monas, a nanoflagellate protist (Chrysophyceae: Ochromonadales: Ochromonadaceae: Chrysomonadida: Ochromonadidae). Subsequently, the term "monas" was used in the early history of microbiology to denote single-celled organisms.

Grammar

In English to make a vernacular name for members of a genus, i.e. trivialising the scientific name, the scientific name is taken and written with sentence case and in roman type (i.e. "standard") as opposed to uppercase italic, the plurals are generally constructed by adding an "s", regardless of Greco-Roman grammar. In the case of genera ending in monas the ending is changed to monad with plural -monads. Example: a member of the genus Pseudomonas is a pseudomonad, while two are pseudomonads. The use of the stem for non-nominative cases is seen more often in botany, where trivialisation is more common, e.g. a bromeliad is a member of the genus Bromelia.

Archaeal genera

Bacterial genera

See also
 -bacter

References

monas
Bacterial taxonomy
Biological nomenclature
English suffixes